City and Hunslet is a ward in the metropolitan borough of the City of Leeds, West Yorkshire, England.  It contains over 400 listed buildings that are recorded in the National Heritage List for England.  Of these, eight are listed at Grade I, the highest of the three grades, 30 at Grade II*, the middle grade, and the others are at Grade II, the lowest grade.

Leeds is the largest city in Yorkshire, and has been a commercial centre since the 15th century.  Its major industry has been textiles, especially wool, and later flax, the latter becoming a speciality of the city.  Transport was provided by the Aire and Calder Navigation, begun in 1699, the Leeds and Liverpool Canal, opened in 1777, and the railways from the 1830s.  The commercial centre developed to the north of the railway and river, with mills mainly around the river, and factories to the south of this producing machine parts for the mills, locomotives, and other items.  This history is reflected by the listed buildings.  The growing wealth of the area resulted in the building of Georgian houses and terraces in the later 18th and early 19th centuries, and this was following later in the 19th century by grand buildings housing offices, warehouses, banks and hotels.  In due course impressive civic buildings, theatres and  shopping arcades followed.

This list includes the listed buildings in the area to the south of the railway running from west to east on the south of the centre of the city.  It contains the areas of Holbeck, Hunslet, and parts of Beeston Hill and Stourton.  The northern part of the area is largely industrial, with more residential parts to the south.  The listed buildings include mills, warehouses, factories and the remains of factories, many of which have been converted for other uses.  The River Aire and the Aire and Calder Navigation pass through the area, and listed buildings associated with these include locks, a dock basin, a weir, cranes, retaining walls.  The other listed buildings include civic buildings, houses and associated structures, churches, chapels and associated structures, public houses, bridges, and two war memorials.


Key

Buildings

References

Citations

Sources

 

Lists of listed buildings in West Yorkshire